Philip M. Jarrett is an English author and aviation historian. In 1971, he was the assistant editor of Aerospace, a periodical published by the Royal Aeronautical Society. From 1973 to 1980, he was the assistant editor of Aeroplane Monthly.  From 1980 to 1989, he worked for Flight International, initially as the chief sub-editor, and then as production editor. Since 1990, he has been a freelance author, editor, and consultant.

In 2014, he was made an Honorary Companion of the Royal Aeronautical Society, in recognition of his work as an aviation historian.

Publications

As author

As co-author

As editor

References

Year of birth missing (living people)
Companions of the Royal Aeronautical Society
English non-fiction writers
20th-century non-fiction writers
21st-century non-fiction writers
Aviation writers
Living people